"Curtain Call" is a song by the American hip-hop soul duo Nina Sky. It was released as second single from their unreleased second studio album on August 12, 2008. It features a guest appearance rapper Rick Ross. In 2007, Nina Sky announced new album The Musical featuring Rick Ross. The album was never released because of many issues with their record label Polo Grounds/J. The second single from upcoming album was later announced to be "Curtain Call". Although single was moderately successful, no music video was released. Instead, duo filmed a music video for their following single "On Some Bullshit".

Commercial performance
The single didn't perform well anywhere. It failed to chart anywhere but United States and also failed to chart on Billboard Hot 100. It peaked at number thirty-five on US Rhythmic Top 40 and number seventy-nine on US Hot R&B/Hip-Hop Songs. "Curtain Call" was the final single from Nina Sky to chart on any chart, since later singles weren't promoted and failed to chart. They also left Polo Grounds/J and switched on releasing music independent, so all of their later singles failed to chart.

Track listing

CD single
 "Curtain Call" (Main Version) (featuring Rick Ross) - 4:09
 "Curtain Call" (No Rap) - 3:49
 "Curtain Call" (Instrumental) - 4:34
 "Curtain Call" (Call Out Hook) - 0:10

Vinyl 12" single
A-side
 "Curtain Call" (Main) - 4:09
 "Curtain Call" (Instrumental) - 4:34

B-side
 "Curtain Call" (No Rap) - 3:49
 "Curtain Call" (Instrumental) - 4:34

Charts

References

External links
 Lyric video for the song

2008 singles
Nina Sky songs
2007 songs